The Yine (also Piro) are an indigenous people in Peru. In the Cusco, Loreto, and Ucayali Departments, they live along the Urubamba River. They live along the Madre de Dios River in the Madre de Dios Department.

Name
Besides Yine, they are also called Chontaquiro, Contaquiro, Pira, Piro, Pirro, Simiranch, and Simirinche.

Economy and subsistence
Yine people farm, fish, and raise livestock, particularly cattle. They also work in the lumber industry. They traditionally used swidden agriculture to grow yuca. Oxfam helped the Yine to secure ownership rights to their traditional farmlands and to develop sustainable farming practices. They grow several varieties of yuca today, as well as medicine plants, such as sangre de grado (Croton lechleri).

Language
Yine people speak the Yine language, which is a Piro language and part of the Southern Maipuran language family. It is written in the Latin script. Over half of the Yine people have a basic literacy rate.

See also
Mashco Piro

Notes

External links
 Piro artwork, National Museum of the American Indian

Indigenous peoples in Peru
Indigenous peoples of the Amazon